Beyond Magnetic is the second extended play by American heavy metal band Metallica. It was released to coincide with the band's 30th anniversary shows, in which they released a new song for all four days of the shows. It was originally released as a digital download exclusively on iTunes on December 13, 2011. All four songs featured on Beyond Magnetic were recorded for the group's Death Magnetic sessions but had not been released. Beyond Magnetic was released on CD on January 30, 2012 internationally and on the following day in the United States. As of September 2016, it has sold over 210,000 copies in the U.S.

Release 
The band stated the following about the EP:

On January 3, 2012, Metallica announced that Beyond Magnetic was to be released as a CD on January 31 in the U.S. and January 30 internationally. It was also announced that the EP would be released on vinyl, and would be made available on April 21 in celebration of Record Store Day.

Reception 

Reviews of Beyond Magnetic have been largely positive. AllMusic gave it a rating of four out of five stars, and reviewer Stephen Erlewine called the EP "as potent as its 2008 parent". Consequence of Sound, however, found the album "pointless", because the band's best material had already been packaged together successfully for Death Magnetic, leaving "a half hour of rough cuts" behind "for good reason."

During its first week of release, Beyond Magnetic sold 36,000 copies and peaked at number 32 on the Billboard 200. The album has sold 210,000 copies in the United States as of September 2016.

Track listing

Credits 
Writing, performance and production credits are adapted from the album's liner notes.

Personnel

Metallica 
 James Hetfield – vocals, rhythm guitar, lead guitar on "Just a Bullet Away"
 Kirk Hammett – lead guitar, rhythm guitar on "Just a Bullet Away"
 Robert Trujillo – bass
 Lars Ulrich – drums

Production 
 Rick Rubin – production
 Lindsay Chase – production coordination
 Kent Matcke – production coordination (at HQ only)
 Greg Fidelman – recording
 Mike Gillies – recording
 Sara Lyn Killion – recording assistant
 Joshua Smith – recording assistant
 Adam Fuller – recording assistant
 Vlado Meller – mastering

Artwork and design 
 Anton Corbijn – photography

Studios 
 Sound City Studios, Los Angeles, California – recording
 Shangri La, Malibu, California – recording
 HQ, San Rafael, California – recording
 Masterdisk – mastering

Charts

Weekly charts

Year-end charts

Release history

References

External links 
 
  Beyond Magnetic at Metallica's official website

2011 EPs
Metallica EPs
Albums produced by Rick Rubin
Warner Records EPs
ITunes-exclusive releases
Record Store Day releases
Thrash metal EPs
Albums recorded at Shangri-La (recording studio)